Adultery: A User's Guide is a 1995 Swiss romantic comedy-drama film directed by Christine Pascal. The film was selected as the Swiss entry for the Best Foreign Language Film at the 68th Academy Awards, but was not accepted as a nominee.

Cast
 Richard Berry as Simon Chama
 Karin Viard as Fabienne Corteggiani
 Vincent Cassel as Bruno Corteggiani
 Emmanuelle Halimi as Sarah
 Hélène Fillières as Joséphine
 Liliane Rovère as Simon's mistress
 Anny Romand as The unknown
 Julien Courbey as The young commuter

See also
 List of submissions to the 68th Academy Awards for Best Foreign Language Film
 List of Swiss submissions for the Academy Award for Best Foreign Language Film

References

External links
 

1995 films
1990s French-language films
French-language Swiss films

Swiss romance films
1995 comedy-drama films
Swiss comedy-drama films
Swiss romantic comedy-drama films